Dictyonella is a genus of sponges belonging to the family Dictyonellidae.

The genus has almost cosmopolitan distribution.

Species:

Dictyonella alonsoi 
Dictyonella arenosa 
Dictyonella chlorophyllacea 
Dictyonella conglomerata 
Dictyonella foliaformis 
Dictyonella funicularis 
Dictyonella hirta 
Dictyonella incisa 
Dictyonella madeirensis 
Dictyonella marsilii 
Dictyonella obtusa 
Dictyonella pelligera

References

Heteroscleromorpha
Sponge genera